Sidkeong Tulku Namgyal (Wylie: srid skyong sprul sku rnam rgyal) (1879–5 December 1914) was the ruling Maharaja and Chogyal of Sikkim for a brief period in 1914, from 10 February to 5 December.

Biography 
He was the second son of Maharaja Sri Panch Sir Thutob Namgyal, and was educated at St. Paul's School, Darjeeling and at Pembroke College, Oxford. A polyglot, he was learned in Chinese, English, Hindi, Lepcha, Nepali and Tibetan.

He was recognised as the reincarnation (tulku) of his uncle, Sidkeong Namgyal, the abbot of Phodong Monastery. Sidkeong Tulku Namgyal reconstructed the monastery.

After his education in Oxford, he returned to Sikkim where he was closely associated with the administration of the country. He worked to dissolve the greed that occurs in vested interests and tried to unify Buddhists by renovating monasteries and their roles.

When Alexandra David-Néel was invited to the royal monastery of Sikkim, she met Sidkeong Tulku Namgyal, at that time Maharaj Kumar (crown prince). She became Sidkeong's "confidante and spiritual sister".

Engaged to Burmese princess
Sidkeong and Princess Hteiktin Ma Lat of Limbin then began a regular correspondence. Prince Limbin (Ma Lat's father) and his family soon returned to Burma (to live in Rangoon) and Sidkeong visited them there in 1912. By then they had agreed to get married, the British having secured Limbin's approval. The wedding was initially set for 1913 but then delayed because of the king of Sikkim Thutob Namgyal (Sidkeong's father's) deteriorating health. In February 1914 the old king died, Sidkeong became king, and his wedding to Ma Lat was set for 10 February 1915. The two exchanged many letters expressing their love for one another and how much they looked forward to a life together.

Death
In December 1914, Sidkeong was found dead in his bedroom, apparently of heart failure, aged 35, in what the British described as 'mysterious circumstances'. He was succeeded by his younger brother, Tashi Namgyal. Palden Thondup Namgyal was subsequently recognised as the reincarnate leader of Phodong.

Titles
1879 - 1899: Prince Sidkeong Tulku Namgyal
1899 - 1911: Maharajkumar Sri Panch Sidkeong Tulku Namgyal
1911 - 1914: Maharajkumar Sri Panch Sidkeong Tulku Namgyal, CIE
1914: His Highness Sri Panch Sikeong Tulku Namgyal, Maharaja Chogyal of Sikkim, CIE

Honours
British Empire
Delhi Durbar Medal, 1 January 1903.
Delhi Durbar Medal, 11 December 1911.
CIE: Companion of the Order of the Indian Empire, 12 December 1911.

Ancestry

Notes

References

External links

Indian maharajas
20th-century Indian monarchs
Tulkus
Monarchs of Sikkim
Companions of the Order of the Indian Empire
1879 births
1914 deaths